Ottavio Semini (c. 1530–1604) was an Italian painter of the late-Renaissance.

He was born and trained in Genoa and died in Milan. He was the son and pupil of Antonio Semini, and was influenced by Perino del Vaga. Aided his brother Andrea in many works, but was obliged to leave Genoa on account of a homicide and rape, and afterwards led a dissipated life in Milan. He helped paint for the chapel of San Girolamo in St. Angelo in Milan. With his brother, Andrea Semini, he frescoed some salons the Palazzo Marino in Milan. He may have committed suicide. Among his pupils were Paolo Camillo Landriani and Niccolosio Granielli.

The large fresco of the last supper, located in the refectory of the Certosa di Pavia was painted by Ottavio Semini in 1567.

References
Cyclopedia of Painters and Paintings edited by John Denison Champlin, Charles Callahan Perkins, Volume IV, Scribner and Sons (1887): page 170.
Abecedario Pittorico del M.R.P. Pellegrino Antonio Orlandi, Naples, 1763. p348. 
Notizie de' professori del disegno da Cimabue in qua, By Filippo Baldinucci. page 225 .

1530s births
1604 deaths
16th-century Italian painters
Italian male painters
17th-century Italian painters
Painters from Genoa
Italian Mannerist painters